Manna Project International (MPI) is an organization that enables young adults to travel to international communities in need and to work in these locations. It is a 501(c)3 nonprofit registered in Nashville, Tennessee. MPI's mission is "to foster communities of young adults and encourage them to use their passions and education in service to communities in need." Through teams of college graduates committed to living and working together for one year in a developing country (currently Nicaragua and Ecuador), MPI seeks to catalyze bottom-up change in resource-scarce communities. 

MPI was founded in 2004 outside Managua, Nicaragua, by a handful of graduates mostly from Vanderbilt University. Since then, MPI has expanded internationally to Quito, Ecuador, and to eight other university campuses. 

In Nicaragua, community programs include:

After-school literacy
After-school math
English classes
Creative arts
Health education program
Women's health and exercise
Child sponsorship
Preschool
Feeding program
Community center development
Sports and recreation
Educational scholarships
Microfinance
Health clinic development

Partners in Nicaragua include Alongside Ministries, the Gutierrez family, Project HOPE (USA), and Worcester State College.

At the Ecuador site, programs include:
Career skills and computer literacy classes
Adult English
Youth English
After-school homework help
Children's Art
Children's Nutrition programs at local elementary schools
Adult Nutrition & Cooking classes
Yoga and Zumba
Children's Dance classes
Health classes for children and adults

Partners in Ecuador include Hogar de la Madre Soltera, Esperanza y Progreso del Valle: Cooperativa de Ahorro y Credito, the United Nation's Peacekeepers, Universidad de las Fuerzas Armadas, Colegio Chaupitena, Colegio Fajardo, and Antorcha de la Vida.

References

External links
MPI Website
Vanderbilt View article, May 2008
MPI-Ecuador blog
MPI-Guatemala blog

Charities based in Tennessee
Foreign charities operating in Nicaragua
Microfinance organizations
Foreign charities operating in Ecuador